Florjan is a settlement in the Municipality of Šoštanj in northern Slovenia. The area is part of the traditional region of Styria. The municipality is now included in the Savinja Statistical Region.

Name
The name of the settlement was changed from Sveti Florjan to Sveti Florjan pri Šoštanju in 1955. The name was changed again in 1984 to Florjan.

Church
The local church from which the settlement gets its name is dedicated to Saint Florian and belongs to the Parish of Šoštanj. It dates to the 16th century.

References

External links
Florjan at Geopedia

Populated places in the Municipality of Šoštanj